George Etienne Gauthier, OC (December 31, 1911 – November 26, 1983) was a Canadian civil servant. 

He was born in Sorel-Tracy, Quebec and attended University of Montreal H.E.C. In 1968, he was made an Officer of the Order of Canada for his contribution to Centennial Year, especially as Associate Commissioner on the Centennial Commission.

External links
For Canada's sake: The centennial celebrations of 1967, state legitimation and the restructuring of Canadian public life
Order of Canada Site
"Centennial Aim: Dialogue", The News and Eastern Townships Advocate, December 15, 1966, p. 25

1911 births
1983 deaths
HEC Montréal alumni
Officers of the Order of Canada
People from Sorel-Tracy
20th-century Canadian civil servants